The machine gun is a type of automatic firearm. Colloquially the term may refer to the broader category of automatic firearms.

Machine Gun may also refer to:

Music
 Machine Gun (band), an American jazz group
 Randy Hansen's Machine Gun, an American band (1977–1980) named for the Jimi Hendrix song (see below)

Albums
 Machine Gun (Commodores album) or the title song, 1974
 Machine Gun (Peter Brötzmann album) or the title song, 1968
 Machine Gun: The Fillmore East First Show, by Jimi Hendrix; recorded 1969, released 2016

Songs
 "Machine Gun" (Chase & Status song), 2013
 "Machine Gun" (Jimi Hendrix song), 1970
 "Machine Gun" (Portishead song), 2008
 "Machine Gun" (Warrant song), 1992
 "Machine Gun", by Big Bad Voodoo Daddy from Big Bad Voodoo Daddy, 1994
 "Machine Gun", by Slowdive from Souvlaki, 1993

Nickname or ring name
Machine Gun Kelly (disambiguation), several people, and other uses
Karl Anderson (born 1980), ring name "The Machine Gun", American professional wrestler
Lou Butera (born 1937), American Hall-of-Fame pool player
Dennis Thompson (drummer) (born 1948), American rock drummer
 The Motor City Machineguns, a professional wrestling tag team from Detroit, Michigan

See also
 
Machine pistol
Submachine gun
Gatling gun
Ray "Gunner" Kelly (1906-1977), Australian police officer
Lists of people by nickname